Rongmon (Assamese: ৰংমন) is a series of popular monthly comics from Assam, India published by Malini Publications. The series was created by Ruman Bordoloi. Rongmon is known as the first Assamese language comic book series to be printed in colour.

The first edition of the series was published in February 2005. On 16 July 2011, first edition of the comic was uploaded on its website.

See also 

 Mouchak (Assamese magazine)
 Tinkle
 List of Assamese periodicals

References 

Children's magazines
Assamese-language mass media
Assamese-language books